Plaza de Armas is an urban square in Centro, Guadalajara, in the Mexican state of Jalisco.

Guadalajara Cathedral and the Palacio de Gobierno de Jalisco border the square.

See also
 Antimonumenta (Guadalajara)
 Guadalajara Centro railway station, a light train station below the plaza

References

External links

 

Centro, Guadalajara
Plazas in Jalisco